The Police (Superannuation) Act 1906 (6 Edw. 7, c. 7) was an Act of the Parliament of the United Kingdom amending the system of police pensions for England and Wales established by the Police Act 1890, Police (Scotland) Act 1890 and Police Act 1893. Four years later similar amendments were made for Scotland by the Police (Scotland) Act (1890) Amendment Act 1910 (10 Edw. 7 & 1 Geo. 5, c. 10).

It allowed forces to let an officer retain his pension entitlement even if he continued to serve after he could have retired without a medical certificate and required them to have an annual medical inspection of such officers and to require them to retire if they proved to be no longer physically fit for further service.

The Act also allowed previous service on which a pension had not yet been claimed to be added to an officer's entitlement if he rejoined the police. It allowed time spent back in the armed forces after recall as an Army or Royal Navy reservist also to count towards an officer's pension entitlement, thus repealing and replacing the Police Reservists Act 1902. It also set a maximum age of 65 but allowed a maximum extension of five years if a police authority decided that officer's retirement at 65 "would be detrimental to the interests of the police force".

References

United Kingdom Acts of Parliament 1906
Police legislation in the United Kingdom
Pensions in the United Kingdom